In geometry, a spherical cap or spherical dome is a portion of a sphere or of a ball cut off by a plane. It is also a spherical segment of one base, i.e., bounded by a single plane. If the plane passes through the center of the sphere (forming a great circle), so that the height of the cap is equal to the radius of the sphere, the spherical cap is called a hemisphere.

Volume and surface area
The volume of the spherical cap and the area of the curved surface may be calculated using combinations of
 The radius  of the sphere
 The radius  of the base of the cap
 The height  of the cap
 The polar angle  between the rays from the center of the sphere to the apex of the cap (the pole) and the edge of the disk forming the base of the cap

so that

Substituting this into the formulas gives:

Deriving the surface area intuitively from the spherical sector volume 
Note that aside from the calculus based argument below, the area of the spherical cap may be derived from the volume  of the spherical sector, by an intuitive argument, as

The intuitive argument is based upon summing the total sector volume from that of infinitesimal triangular pyramids. Since each , in the limit, is constant and equivalent to the radius  of the sphere, the sum of the infinitesimal pyramidal bases would equal the area of the spherical sector, and:

Deriving the volume and surface area using calculus 

The volume and area formulas may be derived by examining the rotation of the function 
 
The area is

and hence

The formula for the area is therefore

The volume is

Applications

Volumes of union and intersection of two intersecting spheres

The volume of the union of two intersecting spheres

where

is the sum of the volumes of the two isolated spheres, and

the sum of the volumes of the two spherical caps forming their intersection. If  is the
distance between the two sphere centers, elimination of the variables  and  leads
to

Volume of a spherical cap with a curved base 

That is, the curvature of the base comes from sphere 2. The volume is thus the difference between sphere 2's cap (with height ) and sphere 1's cap (with height ),

Areas of intersecting spheres 

They intersect if

From the law of cosines, the polar angle of the spherical cap on the sphere of radius  is

Using this, the surface area of the spherical cap on the sphere of radius  is

Surface area bounded by parallel disks 

The curved surface area of the spherical segment bounded by two parallel disks is the difference of surface areas of their respective spherical caps.

For example, assuming the Earth is a sphere of radius 6371 km, the surface area of the arctic (north of the Arctic Circle, at latitude 66.56° as of August 2016) is 2·63712|sin 90° − sin 66.56°| = 21.04 million km2, or 0.5·|sin 90° − sin 66.56°| = 4.125% of the total surface area of the Earth.

This formula can also be used to demonstrate that half the surface area of the Earth lies between latitudes 30° South and 30° North in a spherical zone which encompasses all of the Tropics.

Generalizations

Sections of other solids 
The spheroidal dome is obtained by sectioning off a portion of a spheroid so that the resulting dome is circularly symmetric (having an axis of rotation), and likewise the ellipsoidal dome is derived from the ellipsoid.

Hyperspherical cap 

Generally, the -dimensional volume of a hyperspherical cap of height  and radius  in -dimensional Euclidean space is given by:  

The formula for  can be expressed in terms of the volume of the unit n-ball  and the hypergeometric function  or the regularized incomplete beta function  as
,

and the area formula  can be expressed in terms of the area of the unit n-ball  as
 ,
where .

Press) the following formulas were derived: 
, where 
,

.

For odd 

.

Asymptotics 

A more quantitative bound is
.

See also 

 Circular segment — the analogous 2D object
 Solid angle — contains formula for n-sphere caps
 Spherical segment
 Spherical sector
 Spherical wedge

References

Further reading

External links 

  Derivation and some additional formulas.
 Online calculator for spherical cap volume and area.
 Summary of spherical formulas.

Spherical geometry